Đorđe Gordić (born 5 November 2004) is a Serbian football attacking midfielder who plays for Lommel SK.

Career
On 3 January 2023, Gordić signed for Lommel SK of the Challenger Pro League, the second division in Belgian football.

References

External links
 
 
 
 

2004 births
Living people
People from Priboj
Association football midfielders
Serbian footballers
Serbian SuperLiga players
FK Mladost Lučani players
Lommel S.K. players
Serbia under-21 international footballers
Serbia youth international footballers
Serbian expatriate footballers
Expatriate footballers in Belgium
Serbian expatriate sportspeople in Belgium